Bluey is an Australian animated television series for preschoolers that premiered on ABC Kids on 1 October 2018. The series was created by Joe Brumm with Queensland production group Ludo Studio. The show follows Bluey, an anthropomorphic six-year-old Blue Heeler puppy who is characterised by her abundance of energy, imagination and curiosity about the world. The young dog lives with her father, Bandit; mother, Chilli; and younger sister, Bingo, who regularly joins Bluey on adventures as the pair embark on imaginative play together. Other characters featured are each depicted as a different dog breed, some inspired by dogs from Brumm's childhood. Overarching themes include the influence of a supportive family, Australian culture, and the importance of play throughout childhood. The program was created and produced in Queensland; its capital city, Brisbane, inspires the show's setting. The series was co-commissioned by the Australian Broadcasting Corporation and the British Broadcasting Corporation. BBC Studios hold global distribution and merchandising rights. The international broadcasting rights to the series were acquired by The Walt Disney Company in 2019.

Since its debut on 1 October 2018, Bluey has broadcast 141 episodes, and its third series first aired on 5 September 2021. Two Christmas-themed episodes have aired, as part of both the first ("Verandah Santa") and second series ("Christmas Swim"). An Easter-themed episode ("Easter") aired as part of the second series, and a Father's Day-themed episode ("Perfect") aired as part of the third. Richard Jeffery won an Australian Directors' Guild Award in 2021 for his direction of the episode "Sleepytime"; the episode itself won the 2022 Prix Jeunesse International Award in the category of TV – Up to 6 Years Fiction (Children's). The musical scores for specific episodes of Bluey have been nominated for APRA Screen Music Awards, credited to Joff Bush as the composer. These include "Teasing" and "Flat Pack", which were both nominated for Best Music for Children's Television in 2019 and 2020 respectively. Selected episodes have also been adapted into picture books, including "The Beach", which won the Australian Book Industry Awards for Book of the Year and Children's Picture Book of the Year (Ages 0–6) in 2020. Episodes from the first and second series have also been on DVD in Australia, distributed by BBC Studios, in volumes.

Series overview

Episodes

Series 1 (2018–19)

Series 2 (2020–21)

Series 3 (2021–23)

Ratings

References
Notes

Citations

External links
 

Lists of Australian children's television series episodes
2020s television-related lists
2010s television-related lists
Episodes